Syed Abdullah Shah Qadri (1680–1757), known popularly as Baba Bulleh Shah (or Bullhe Shah) and Bulleya, was a Muslim Punjabi philosopher, reformer and Sufi poet during 17th-century Punjab. His ancestors had migrated from Bukhara (modern-day Uzbekistan) some three hundred years earlier. His first spiritual teacher was Shah Inayat Qadiri, a Sufi murshid of Lahore. He was a mystic poet and is universally regarded as "The Father of Punjabi Enlightenment". He was a "revolutionary" poet who spoke against powerful religious, political and social institutions and, thus, his influence can be seen on many noted socialists and rights activists. During his lifetime, he was outcasted as kafir (non-Muslim) by some Muslim clerics. He lived and was buried in Kasur in present day Pakistan.

Biography 
He was born around 1680 in Uch, Multan province, Mughal Empire (present day Punjab, Pakistan). Bulleh Shah was an eminent scholar of Arabic and Persian. After his early education, he went to Lahore where he met Inayat Qadri, and became his disciple.

Bulleh Shah's father, Shah Muhammad Darwaish, was well-versed in Arabic, Persian, and the Quran. Due to uncertain reasons, he had to move to Malakwal, a village of Sahiwal. Later, when Bulleh Shah was six years old, his family moved to Pandoke, which is 50 miles southeast of Kasur. Bulleh Shah was schooled by his father, along with the other children of the village. Most sources confirm that Bulleh Shah had to work as a child and adolescent herder in the village. It is confirmed that he received his higher education in Kasur. Some historians claim that Bulleh Shah received his education at a highly reputed madrassa run by Hafiz Ghulam Murtaza where he taught for some time after his graduation. After his early education, he went to Lahore where he met Inayat Arian, and became his disciple.

He died in 1757, at the age of 77 and was buried in Kasur, where he had spent most of his life. A dargah was built over his grave. He was declared non-Muslim by a few literalist "Mullah" of Kasur and they had claimed it was prohibited to offer the funeral prayer of Bulleh Shah due to Kufr fatwa (allegations) put on him by extremists. His funeral prayer was led by Qazi Hafiz Syed Zahid Hamdani, a great religious personality of Kasur.

He was buried in Kasur when he died around 1757. 

A brief biographical sketch of him is found in "Encyclopaedia of Indian Literature" (1987), which reports C. L. Osborne as the pioneer to write an English monograph on Bulleh Shah's life and work.

Poetry 
Bulleh Shah lived after the Punjabi Sufi poet and saint Fariduddin Ganjshakar (1179–1266) and lived in the same period as other Punjabi Sufi poet Sultan Bahu (1629–1691). His lifespan also overlapped with the Punjabi poet Waris Shah (1722–1799), of Heer Ranjha fame and the Sindhi Sufi poet Abdul Wahab (1739–1829), better known by his pen name Sachal Sarmast. Amongst Urdu poets, Bulleh Shah lived 400 miles away from Mir Taqi Mir (1723–1810) of Delhi.

Bulleh Shah practised the Sufi tradition of Punjabi poetry established by poets like Shah Hussain (1538–1599), Sultan Bahu (1629–1691), and Shah Sharaf (1640–1724).

The verse form Bulleh Shah primarily employed is the Kafi, popular in Punjabi and Sindhi poetry. His poetry is a mixture of traditional mystic thought and intellectualism.

Many people have put his Kafis to music, from humble street-singers to renowned Sufi singers like Nusrat Fateh Ali Khan, Fareed Ayaz, Pathanay Khan, Abida Parveen, the Waddali Brothers and Sain Zahoor, from the synthesised techno qawwali remixes of UK-based Asian artists to the Pakistani rock band Junoon.

Among the most distinguished persons to be influenced by Bulleh Shah's poetry had been Sir Muhammad Iqbal. It is maintained that Iqbal took his last breath while listening to his kafi.

He is the "most famous and celebrated" Punjabi poet and is widely recognized as "poet par excellence".

Philosophy and views 

Bulleh Shah's non-orthodox views and simple language played important role in popularization of his poetry. It has been noted in literature that "one reason for his all-time popularity is relatively modern vocabulary."  Among the core tenets of his philosophy includes humanism, equality, tolerance, rejection of double standards and defiance of the authority of Ulama and blind faith in their authority. For his criticism of replication of beliefs (blind faith and following), the "Oxford Textbook of Spirituality in Healthcare" compared Bulleh Shah with Percy Bysshe Shelley. Among major taboos in his philosophy was reciting words without comprehending them. He was a reformer with very much conscious of the contemporary religious, political and social situations. 

In Bulleh Shah's poetry, Sufism can be seen as an indigenous philosophy of political activism and class struggle and resistance to powerful institutions like religion and imperialism. Through his poems he spoke against "religious, political and social patriarchal high handedness" of his time. This side of his poetry is evident from his defying of the imperial ban on dancing and singing, and support for Sikhs, in general, and Guru Tegh Bahadur and Guru Gobind Singh, in particular, in their struggle against the imperialist Mughal Empire. Thus, his version of sufism is usually considered opposite to that of Ali Hajweri and other 'more spiritual' sufis who were confined to their libraries and schools and rarely participated in public discourse. A Pakistani scholar noted "those who wish their offerings at Daata Saheb (dargah of Ali Hajweri) consider whirlers at Bulleh Shah as kafir (non-Muslim/ non-believer)."

Bulleh Shah was a "revolutionary" and "rebel" poet who spoke against powerful religious, political and social institutions of his time and, thus, his influence can be seen on many noted socialists, progressives and workers and women rights activists like Jam Saqi, Taimur Rahman, Bhagat Singh, Faiz Ahmad Faiz, Madeeha Gauhar, and Major Ishaque Muhammad.

Humanism is one of the key attributes of the life and works of Bulleh Shah. Thus, there is no wonder why he is equally respected among many Muslims, Sikhs and Hindus of India and Pakistan.

Modern renderings

Bands and albums
In the 1990s, Junoon, a rock band from Pakistan, rendered his poems "Bullah Ki Jaana" and "Aleph" ("Ilmon Bas Kareen O Yaar"). In 2004, Indian musician Rabbi Shergill turned the abstruse metaphysical poem "Bullah Ki Jaana" into a rock/fusion song in his debut album Rabbi; the song was a chart-topper in 2005, helping the album to eventually sell over 10,000 copies and became immensely popular in India and Pakistan.

The Wadali Bandhu, a Punjabi Sufi group from India, have also released a version of "Bullah Ki Jaana" in their album Aa Mil Yaar... Call of the Beloved. Another version was performed by Lakhwinder Wadali and entitled "Bullah". Dama Dam Mast Qalandar, a qawwali composed in honour of Shahbaz Qalandar, has been one of Bulleh Shah's most popular poems and has been frequently rendered by many Indian, Pakistani and Bangladeshi singers including Noor Jehan, Ustad Nusrat Fateh Ali Khan, Abida Parveen, Sabri Brothers, Wadali brothers, Reshman and Runa Laila. Other qawwali songs by Bulleh Shah, include "Sade Vehre Aya Kar" and "Mera Piya Ghar Aaya". In 2008, a version of Bulleh Shah's famous verse, Aao Saiyo Ral Deyo Ni Wadhai, was sung by Shafqat Amanat Ali Khan, for his debut solo album, Tabeer. Ali named the song "Bulleh Shah" in honor of the poet. 

Also in 2016, a collaboration between two EDM artists (Headhunterz and Skytech) named "Kundalini" used words created by Bulleh Shah, as well as having the words Bulleh Shah in the lyrics. Bulleh Shah's verses have been an inspiration to painters as well, as in the two series of paintings (Jogia Dhoop and Shah Shabad) by an Indian painter Geeta Vadhera inspired by the poetry of Bulleh Shah and other Sufi poets and saints. In 2017, British Pakistani singer Yasir Akhtar used Bulleh Shah's poetry in his song "Araam Naal Kar – Take it Easy". In 2019, Sona Mohapatra used a Kalam of Bulleh Shah in her song "R.A.T Mashup".

Films
The 1973 movie Bobby song by Narendra Chanchal starts with the verse Beshaq mandir masjid todo, Bulleh Shah ye kahta. Some of Bulleh Shah's verses, including "Tere Ishq Nachaya", have been adapted and used in Bollywood film songs including "Chaiyya Chaiyya" and "Thayya Thayya" in the 1998 film Dil Se.., "Tere Ishq Nachaya" in the 2002 film Shaheed-E-Azam and "Ranjha Ranjha" in the 2010 film Raavan. The 2007 Pakistani movie Khuda Kay Liye includes Bulleh Shah's poetry in the song "Bandeya Ho". The 2008 Bollywood film, A Wednesday, included a song titled "Bulle Shah, O Yaar Mere". In 2014, Ali Zafar sung some of his verses as "Chal Buleya" for Bollywood soundtrack album Total Siyapaa, and the song was reprised by Zafar same year in Pakistan Idol. The 2016 Bollywood films "Sultan" and Ae Dil Hai Mushkil feature the song "Bulleya", sung by Papon and Amit Mishra respectively, which is short for Bulleh Shah. Poetry of Bulleh Shah was also used in 2015 film Wedding Pullav composed by Salim–Sulaiman. A song "Hun Kis Theen" based on his poetry was also featured in Punjabi animated film Chaar Sahibzaade: Rise of Banda Singh Bahadur.

Coke Studio (Pakistan)
In 2009, the season 2 of Coke Studio featured "Aik Alif" performed by Sain Zahoor and Noori. Ali Zafar also used some of Bulleh Shah and Shah Hussain's verses in his "Dastan-e-Ishq". In 2010, the season 3 featured "Na Raindee Hai" and "Makke Gayaan Gal Mukdi Nahi" performed by Arieb Azhar. In 2012, Shah's poetry was featured with Hadiqa Kiani performing "Kamlee". In 2016, Ahmed Jahanzeb and Umair Jaswal performed "Khaki Banda"; and Rizwan Butt and Sara Haider performed "Meri Meri", In third episode of season 11 Fareed Ayaz, Abu Muhammad Qawal & Brothers performed a Qawwali based on Kalam by Bulleh Shah. In season 12 Hadiqa Kiani used verses of Bulleh Shah in the song "Daachi Waaleya".

Legacy
In 2012, the government of Punjab, most populous province of Pakistan, renamed an important road in the provincial capital Lahore to "Bulleh Shah Road". In 2021, the government of Pakistan also approved his name for a road in the country.
Pakistan's "largest renewable packaging facility" is also named after him.
In 2007, Pakistani senator Chaudhry Manzoor Ahmed raised the proposal for establishment of Bulleh Shah University in Kasur. There is a housing community in Kasur called "Bulleh Shah Colony." Also, a road in Kasur is called "Baba Bulleh Shah Road." A roadway junction on Lahore Ring Road is called "Bulleh Shah Interchange." An educational institute called "Bulleh Shah Institute" operates in Badhni Kalan, India, since 2003.

In the 1960s and 1970s, Zulfikar Ali Bhutto exploited the rising popularity of the ideas of Bulleh Shah, and the slogan of "Roti Kapra aur Makan" (that inspired the film Roti Kapda Aur Makaan) among the common masses and emerged as a populist leader who eventually became the ninth Prime Minister of Pakistan. Bhutto used the term “Dama Dam Mast Qalandar” (a song adapted by Bulleh Shah) in 1973 to predict the political turmoil ahead.

In March 2013, Hamza Shahbaz (on the behalf of Punjab's chief minister Shehbaz Sharif) inaugurated "Yadgar-e-Baba Bulleh Shah" (a memorial to Bulleh Shah) in Kasur. In 2015, in his address then Prime Minister Nawaz Sharif recited a verse of Bulleh Shah.

In February 2006 then Chief Minister of Punjab Chaudhry Pervaiz Elahi addressed a conference at the University of the Punjab, in which he said, Bulleh Shah (and other Sufi's) "were not only preachers, but also historians of social history."

Some testimonies of his influential life and work are listed below:
 Bulleh Shah was "Punjabi's greatest spiritual poet ever" - Shoaib Akhtar.

Works
Bulleh Shah never published his works. However, a significant part of his work has been preserved and published formally in India, Pakistan and abroad. The following is a list of the books containing his poetic works (or its translation).

English works:
 Sufi Lyrics: Selections from a World Classic (Publisher: Harvard University Press), 2021. English Translation by: Christopher Shackle.
 Bulleh Shah: A Selection (Publisher: Oxford University Press), 2016. English Translation by: Taufiq Rafat.
 Bulhe Shah: Volume 141 (Publisher: Sahitya Akademi), 1987 (reprinted in 1990). Author: Surindar Singh Kohli.

Other works:

Dama Dam Mast Qalandar is one of the most famous Sufi songs in India and Pakistan. It was originally written by Amir Khusrau, and was modified by Bulleh Shah. The version composed by Bulleh Shah was sang by Nusrat Fateh Ali Khan, Abida Parveen, Laal (band) and numerous other singers from India and Pakistan. 

A brief biographical sketches of him are found in "Encyclopaedia of Untouchables : Ancient Medieval and Modern" (2008) and "Encyclopaedia of Indian Literature" (1987).

See also 
 List of Punjabi language poets
 Sufism
 Waris Shah
 Hafiz Ghulam Murtaza
 Shah Inayat Qadiri

References

Further reading 
 Bulleh Shah: The Love-Intoxicated Iconoclast, by J. R. Puri, Tilaka Raj Shangri. Radha Soami Satsang Beas, 1986, .
 Great Sufi Poets of the Punjab, by R. M. Chopra, Iran Society, Kolkata, 1999.

External links 

 Biography of Bulleh Shah
 Littérateurs of the Punjabi language
 Complete poetry of Bulleh Shah in Shahmukhi
 Punjabi Poetry of Bulleh Shah
 Kulliyat e Bulleh Shah

Works online 
 Bulleh Shah Ki shairi
 Articles on Bulleh Shah's life and poetry (apna.org)
 Bulleh Shah: Poems (English translations) and Biography (poetry-chaikhana.com)

1680 births
1757 deaths
Mughal Empire poets
Mughal Empire Sufis
People from Kasur District
Punjabi-language poets
Punjabi Sufi saints
Punjabi people
Sufi mystics
Sufi poets
Sufism in Pakistan
Sufi shrines in Pakistan